Mirza Husain Noori Tabarsi (1838 - 1902) popularly known as Muhaddis Noori / Al-Mohaddith Al-Noori, was a Shi'a Islamic Scholar and Shi'a Renaissance.

He came from the town of Noor, Northern Iran in province Tabarestan and was a descendant of the Paduspanids, Spahbed of East dynasty. Mirza Husain Nouri  died at the age of 66 years in Najaf and was laid to rest on the right side of the entrance to the Mausoleum of Imam Ali.

Life
Noori was born on 18 Shawwal 1254 AH at the northern Iranian city of Nour in Mazandaran. Following the completion of his preliminary studies, he strove to scrutinize the vast hadith literature and became an authority in this regard.

Education
Noori studied in Iraq under Morteza Ansari and Mirza Mohammed Hassan Husseini Shirazi. He was an authority on Islamic sciences, including hadith, exegesis of the Holy Qur'an, theology, and biography of ulema.

Noori's masters were:
  Clergyman Mola Fatholah Soltan Abadi
  Molla Shekh Ali Khalili, the jurisprudent
  Mo’ez aldin Seyed Mehdi Ghazvini
  Mirza Mohammad Hashem Khansari
  Ayatollah Haj Molla Kani

Some of his Works 

Noori was an authority on Islamic sciences, including hadith, exegesis of the Holy Qur'an, theology, and biography of ulema. He had numerous students, including Shaikh Abbas Qomi, the author of the famous prayer and supplication manual, "Mafatih al-Jinaan" (Keys of Paradise). He wrote numerous works in both Persian and Arabic, many of them were translated to other languages including English and Urdu. His works include:

 Mustadrak al-Wasāʼil wa-mustanbaṭ al-masāʼil. One of the Shia Hadith-collection books comprising approximately 18 volumes.
Mustadrak Al-vasayel and Mustanbetu Al-Ahkam by Mirza Hossein Noori (1320 AD.). This book included many Hadiths which dropped from the vasayel Al-shia.<>The Primary Sources of Shia Jurisprudence* |모 자 파 리**| , 제35권 제3호 [2015. 02]: 143~166, Mohammad Hassan Mozafari</ref>
 Mustanbetu Al-Ahkam by Mirza Hossein Noori
 An-Najm Al-Thāqib fī Aḥwāl Al-Imām Al-Ḥujja Al-Ghāʼeb (translated to English as the Shooting star). A comprehensive book regarding the twelfth Imam of Twelver Shias, written originally in Persian, and was translated lately to English, Arabic and Urdu. English Translation of: The Shooting Star - An-Najmus Saaqib Fee Ahwaal-e-Imaamul Ghaaeb in PDF format
 Kashf Al-Astār ʿAn Wajh Al-Ghāʼeb ʿAn Al-Abṣār. A refutation to Sunnis regarding the twelfth Imam too, written in Arabic.
 Jannat Al-Maʼwā fīman Fāz Biliqāʼ Al-Ḥujja fī Al-Ghayba Al-Kubrā. A collection of tales of those who claim to have met the twelfth Imam during the Major Occultation period, and it was written in Arabic.
 Nafas Ar-Raḥmān fī Faḍāʼil Salmān. A  biography of Salman the Persian.
 Al-Fayḍ Al-Qudsī fī tarjamat al-ʿAllāmah al-Majlisī. A comprehensive biography of the 17th century renowned cleric Muhammad Baqir Majlisi, and it was printed with Biḥār al-Anwār, and lately printed again separately.
 Faṣl al-khiṭāb fī ithbāt taḥrīf kitāb Rabb al-arbāb  Shīʻah > Shīʻah Doctrines, Published 1881, al-Nūrī al-Ṭabarsī, 
HathiTrust Digital Library.
 Min Behar Al Anwar Maa Takmila (Digital Library of India Item 2015.324119).
 Dār As-Salām fīmā Yataʿallaq Bi Ar-Ruʼyā wal Manām. A treatise on dreams interpretation.
 Jannat al-Maʼwá : fī dhikr man fāza bi-liqāʼ al-ḥujjah, 3 editions published in 1992 in Arabic 
 The shooting star : English translation of An-Najmus saaqib fee ahwaal-e-Imaamul ghaaeb : an account of the concealment of Imam Mahdi (a.s.), the twelfth Imam of the twelver Shia Muslims (1 edition published in 2009 in English) 
 Najm al-s̲āqib : mushtamil bar, aḥvāl-i Imām-i Ghāʼib (4 editions published between 1989 and 1996 in Persian)
 al-Ṣaḥīfah al-ʻAlawīyah al-mubārakah al-thānīyah : min adʻīyat al-Imām ʻAlī ibn Abī Ṭālib
 Kashf al-astār ʻan wajh al-ghāʼib ʻan al-abṣār (5 editions published between 1992 and 2011 in Arabic and Persian)
 Kitāb kalimah ṭayyibah (in Persian) 
 Risālah fī ādāb al-mujāwarah : mujāwarat mashāhid al-Aʼimmah
 al-Najm al-thāqib fī aḥwāl al-Imām al-Ḥujjah al-Ghāʼib 
 Supplement to Muḥammad ibn al-Ḥasan al-Ḥurr al-ʻĀmilī's Wasāʼil al-Shīʻah ilá taḥṣīl masāʼil al-sharīʻah
 Fayz̤-i qudsī : zindagīnāmah-i ʻAllāmh Muḥammad Bāqir Majlisī (2 editions published in 1995 in Persian) 
 Taḥiyat al-zāʼir wa-bulqhat al-mujāwir (2 editions published in 1909 in Persian)
 Kalimah ṭayyibah (3 editions published between 1885 and 1924 in Persian)

Death
Noori died in Najaf, aged 66, on 27 Jumada al-Thani 1320 AH. He was buried on the right side of the entrance to the Mausoleum of Imam Ali.

Allameh Mohaddes Nouri University 

Allameh Mohaddes Nouri University or AMNU, formerly known as Institute of Higher Education, is a non-governmental and non-profit university which was founded in 1996 in the town of Noor, Iran through an official license from Iran's Ministry of Science, Research and Technology (MSRT) with the mission to advance knowledge, science and technology, and train competent and creative talents at undergraduate and graduate levels. It was named after Noori's name.

Notes 

Iranian Shia clerics
1838 births
1902 deaths
Burials at Imam Ali Mosque
People from Nur, Iran